1 Corinthians 9 is the ninth chapter of the First Epistle to the Corinthians in the New Testament of the Christian Bible. It is authored by Paul the Apostle and Sosthenes in Ephesus. Paul defends himself as an apostle.

Text 
The original text was written in Koine Greek. This chapter is divided into 27 verses.

Textual witnesses
Some early manuscripts containing the text of this chapter are:
Papyrus 129 (mid 2nd century; extant verses 1–3, 10–16, 27)
Codex Vaticanus (AD 325–350)
Codex Sinaiticus (330–360)
Codex Alexandrinus (400–440)
Codex Ephraemi Rescriptus (~450; extant verses 7–27)

Paul's apologia
This chapter is devoted to Paul's apologia: "a defence of the Apostolic authority of St Paul". Paul opens this section of his letter with four rhetorical questions:

 "Am I not an apostle?"
 "Am I not free?"
 "Have I not seen Jesus Christ our Lord?"
 "Are you not my work in the Lord?"

He acknowledges that he may not be treated as apostle by others, but asserts that he is an apostle to the churches he has founded and the Corinthian church is the "seal of [his] apostleship in the Lord". The "others" who do not recognise Paul as an apostle may have been emissaries from Jerusalem or the Petrine party, those associated with the slogan "I am for Cephas" in 1 Corinthians 1:12, or possibly "to some who may have arrived at Corinth subsequent to St. Paul's departure, and who, not recognising his Apostleship in relation to themselves, stirred up some of the Corinthians to repudiate it also".

Verse 5 

"A believing wife" (KJV: "a sister, a wife"): The phrase "a sister, a wife" is an Hebraism derived from "my sister, spouse", (Song of Solomon 4:9–10, 12; 5:1). In Judaism men called their wives 'sisters' not on account of religion, which also is not the meaning here, but because of the common relation that men and women in all humankind stand in to one another, as that of man and wife.

"As well as other apostles": for example Philip the Evangelist had four daughters (Acts 21:8–9).
"The brothers of the Lord" (KJV: "the brethren of the Lord"): refers to James, Joses, Judas, and Simon, who were the near kinsmen of Christ.
"Cephas": That is, Peter, who is recorded had a wife (Matthew 8:14).

Verse 9 
 Cross reference: Deuteronomy 25:4

See also 
 Brothers of Jesus
 Cephas
 Related Bible parts: Deuteronomy 25, Song of Songs 4, Romans 14, 1 Corinthians 8, Galatians 1

References

External links 
 King James Bible - Wikisource
English Translation with Parallel Latin Vulgate
Online Bible at GospelHall.org (ESV, KJV, Darby, American Standard Version, Bible in Basic English)
Multiple bible versions at Bible Gateway (NKJV, NIV, NRSV etc.)

09